Sinjwan is a town in northwestern Syria, administratively part of the Latakia Governorate, located north of Latakia. Nearby localities include Sqoubin, Baksa and al-Qanjarah to the north, Sitmarkho to the northeast, Burj al-Qasab to the northwest. According to the Syria Central Bureau of Statistics, Sinjwan had a population of 3,163 in the 2004 census. Its inhabitants are predominantly Alawites.

References

Populated places in Latakia District
Alawite communities in Syria